An oubliette is a type of dungeon.

Oubliette can also refer to:
 Oubliette (The X-Files), an episode of The X-Files
 The Oubliette, a 1914 film starring Lon Chaney, Sr.
 The Oubliette, a spaceship-like prison that appears in Metroid Prime Hunters
 A Moving City of Mars in The Quantum Thief, a 2010 novel by Hannu Rajaniemi